Houldsworth is a surname. Notable people with the surname include: 

Henry Houldsworth of the Houldsworth Baronets
Henry Houldsworth, Lord Lieutenant of Moray
Basil Houldsworth (1922–1990), British anesthetist and politician
Thomas Houldsworth (1771–1852), English politician
William Houldsworth (1834–1917), English politician